Partula martensiana is a species of air-breathing tropical land snail, a terrestrial pulmonate gastropod mollusk in the family Partulidae. This species is endemic to Micronesia.

References

 Mollusc Specialist Group 1996.  Partula martensiana.   2006 IUCN Red List of Threatened Species.   Downloaded on 7 August 2007.

Fauna of Micronesia
Partula (gastropod)
Taxonomy articles created by Polbot
Gastropods described in 1909